The 2014 J.League Cup, also known as the 2014 J.League Yamazaki Nabisco Cup for sponsoring purposes, is the 39th edition of the most prestigious Japanese soccer league cup tournament and the 22nd edition under the current J.League Cup format.

Format
Teams from the J.League Division 1 will take part in the tournament. Cerezo Osaka, Sanfrecce Hiroshima, Yokohama F. Marinos and Kawasaki Frontale were given a bye to the quarter-finals due to qualification in the 2014 AFC Champions League. The remaining 14 teams started from the group stage, where they were divided into two groups of seven. The group winners and the runners-up of each group qualified for the quarter-final along with the four teams which qualified for the AFC Champions League.

Group stage

Standings

Group A

Group B

Results
All times are JST (UTC+9)

Group A

Group B

Knock-out stage
All times are Japan Standard Time (UTC+9)

Quarter-finals

First leg

Second leg

2-2 on aggregate. Sanfrecce Hiroshima won on away goals

Kashiwa Reysol won 5–2 on aggregate.

Kawasaki Frontale won 5–4 on aggregate.

Gamba Osaka won 4–1 on aggregate.

Semi-finals

First leg

Second leg

Sanfrecce Hiroshima won 3–2 on aggregate.

Gamba Osaka won 5-4 on aggregate.

Final

Goalscorers

Updated to games played on 7 September 2014Names of players in bold are still active.
Source:

References

See also

J.League Cup
Lea